Adolfo Bresciano (August 6, 1948 – March 10, 1993) was an Italian-Canadian professional wrestler and promoter, better known by the ring name Dino Bravo.

After training under Gino Brito, he started his career in Montreal in the 1970s, working for Lutte Internationale. He became one of the top professional wrestling stars of Canada; winning several major titles including the Canadian International Heavyweight Championship six times, the NWA Canadian Heavyweight Championship (Toronto version), and the NWA Mid-Atlantic Tag Team Championship. He later signed with the World Wide Wrestling Federation, where as a partner to Dominic DeNucci he won the WWWF World Tag Team Championship. He was also the sole holder of the WWF Canadian Championship before the title was abandoned in 1986.

After leaving professional wrestling, Bravo became involved in organized crime, allegedly working for the Cotroni crime family. He was killed in his home by multiple gunshots in March 1993, and the crime remains unsolved.

Early life
Adolfo Bresciano was born in the commune of Campobasso in southern Italy to Mario and Ausilia Bresciano. The family emigrated to Canada when Bresciano was young, settling in the Centre-Sud neighbourhood of the Montreal borough of Ville-Marie. He started training in amateur wrestling from the age of 12.

Professional wrestling career

Early career (1970–1985) 

Bresciano began wrestling in 1970, taking the name "Dino Bravo" from a wrestler from the early 1960s who had teamed with Dominic DeNucci as the Bravo Brothers, Dino and Dominic. He was trained by Gino Brito and often worked in a tag team with his mentor, billed as Brito's cousin. Bravo worked in a number of other tag teams, partnering with, among others, "Mr. Wrestling" Tim Woods and DeNucci. Bravo held the Jim Crockett Promotions version of the NWA World Tag Team Championship with Woods, winning the title from Gene and Ole Anderson and eventually losing the title to the Andersons. Bravo also had a major program with Blackjack Mulligan, pinning Mulligan twice in a televised non-title match to set up a series of matches for Mulligan's United States title. Bravo did not win the U.S. title from Mulligan, but did receive several shots at NWA World Champion Harley Race during his tenure with Crockett.

By the late 1970s, Bravo had become a big enough draw to get a singles push in the Montreal territory. In December 1978, he defeated Gene Kiniski in Toronto to win the new Canadian heavyweight title as recognized in that area. With Dominic DeNucci, Bravo captured the WWWF World Tag Team Title in March 1978 from Professor Tanaka and Mr. Fuji. Three months later in June, The Yukon Lumberjacks defeated Bravo and DeNucci for the title. In the early 1980s, Bravo and King Tonga (later known as Haku) formed a tag team for a brief while.

World Wrestling Federation (1986–1992) 
Bravo returned to the WWF in late 1986 with a new look. He was now noticeably more muscular and almost immediately began bleaching his brown hair blonde and turned on the Rougeau Brothers to become a heel. He began working as part of Luscious Johnny Valiant's stable with Greg "The Hammer" Valentine and Brutus Beefcake. Beefcake was kicked out of the stable at WrestleMania III and Bravo took his place in The Dream Team tag team with Valentine. Bravo returned to singles competition after a few months and began a strongman gimmick. In his days of wrestling mostly in Canada, Bravo was known as more of a technical wrestler, but with his strongman gimmick his technical side was pushed into the background and his style changed to using power (brawling) moves such as bodyslams, clotheslines, punches and kicks, and other power holds such as the bearhug, while his finishing move changed from an airplane spin to a sidewalk slam. At the 1988 Royal Rumble, Bravo (who was legitimately strong and was said to be able to press more than 500 pounds) attempted to bench press what he claimed was 715 pounds, which would have been a world record at that time. Commentator (and former bodybuilder) Jesse "The Body" Ventura helped lift the bar at one point, but Bravo played the lift as a success and began billing himself as the "World's Strongest Man." In this gimmick, Bravo feuded with Don Muraco, Ken Patera, Ron Garvin, and Jim Duggan.

He played up his Québécois identity by wearing the Fleur-de-lis and was managed by Frenchy Martin, who often toted around a sign reading USA is not OK. In March 1988, Bravo lost in the first round of the WWF Championship tournament at WrestleMania IV against Don Muraco after pulling the referee between himself and Muraco to prevent a hit from the Hawaiian. Before the match to further play on Bravo's "world's strongest man" claim, Jesse Ventura in commentary claimed that during Bravo's "record" lift of 715 pounds, he had only used his "two little pinkies" and had only put two pounds of pressure on the bar. During a rematch at the inaugural SummerSlam at Madison Square Garden in August, Martin distracted Bravo's opponent Muraco to allow Bravo to get the victory (Muraco's usual manager Superstar Billy Graham was doing commentary for the event alongside Gorilla Monsoon, as Ventura was assigned as the guest referee for the main event; thus, Graham, who was not at ringside, could only look on in frustration at Bravo and Martin's illegal tactics). In October at the King of the Ring, Bravo lost to Jim Duggan in a flag match. At the Royal Rumble in January 1989, Bravo, accompanied by Martin, teamed with The Fabulous Rougeau Brothers (Jacques and Raymond) but lost a two out of three falls match against Jim Duggan and The Hart Foundation (Bret Hart and Jim Neidhart). At WrestleMania V Bravo defeated fellow Canadian "Rugged" Ronnie Garvin.

After Frenchy Martin's departure, Bravo joined Jimmy Hart's stable and entered a feud with another power wrestler, The Ultimate Warrior, unsuccessfully challenging Warrior for his WWF Intercontinental Championship. Prior to a WrestleMania VI loss to Duggan, Bravo teamed up with Earthquake. Bravo would often display his strength by doing push ups while the 460 lb. Earthquake sat on his back (although Tenta kept his feet on the floor, so not all of his weight was on his partner). The team of Earthquake and Bravo would go on to have a lengthy feud with Hulk Hogan and Tugboat. Following a WrestleMania VII loss to Kerry Von Erich, he wrestled less frequently, with his next appearance on WWF TV coming in August 1991 as a face (without Jimmy Hart or dyed-blonde hair), now being billed as the "Canadian Strongman, Dino Bravo" in victories over Louie Spicolli and Shane Douglas (who had also defeated Bravo on January 3, 1991, at a house show in Scranton, Pennsylvania). Bravo then began a short run on Montreal house shows as a face, against The Mountie (Jacques Rougeau) and The Barbarian. In his final match, televised on Sky Movies, he and Colonel Mustafa lost to The Legion of Doom in Sheffield, England. Bravo left the WWF and retired from wrestling following a European tour in April 1992. After retiring, he helped train wrestlers in Montreal.

Death
On March 10, 1993, Bresciano was found shot dead at the age of 44. He was hit by 11 bullets in the head and torso at his Vimont, Laval, Quebec home. His alleged role in illegal cigarette smuggling in Canada is popularly believed to have led to his unsolved homicide. According to former opponent Bret Hart, Bresciano confided to friends shortly before his death that he knew his days were numbered. He was a nephew by marriage of Montreal crime boss Vic Cotroni, and was believed by authorities to be involved in his organization for some time. He is entombed at Notre Dame des Neiges Cemetery in Montreal.

His death was the subject of the sixth episode in the second season of wrestling documentary series, Dark Side of the Ring, airing on April 21, 2020.

Championships and accomplishments

Grand Prix Wrestling (Montreal)
Grand Prix Tag Team Championship (2 times) - with Gino Brito
Lutte Internationale
Canadian International Heavyweight Championship (6 times)
Canadian International Tag Team Championship (1 time) – with Tony Parisi
Maple Leaf Wrestling
NWA Canadian Heavyweight Championship (Toronto version) (2 times)
Mid-Atlantic Championship Wrestling
NWA Mid-Atlantic Tag Team Championship (3 times) – with Mr. Wrestling (1), Tiger Conway Jr. (1) and Ricky Steamboat (1)
NWA World Tag Team Championship (Mid-Atlantic version) (1 time) – with Mr. Wrestling
NWA Hollywood Wrestling
NWA Americas Heavyweight Championship (1 time)
NWA Americas Tag Team Championship (1 time) – with Victor Rivera
Pro Wrestling Illustrated
PWI Most Improved Wrestler of the Year (1978)
PWI ranked him # 179 of the 500 best singles wrestlers during the "PWI Years" in 2003.
World Wide Wrestling Federation / World Wrestling Federation
WWF Canadian Championship (1 time, inaugural and final)
WWWF World Tag Team Championship (1 time) – with Dominic DeNucci

See also
 List of premature professional wrestling deaths
 List of unsolved murders

References

External links

1948 births
1993 murders in Canada
1993 deaths
20th-century professional wrestlers
Canadian male professional wrestlers
Canadian murder victims
Deaths by firearm in Quebec
Italian emigrants to Canada
Italian male professional wrestlers
Male murder victims
Burials at Notre Dame des Neiges Cemetery
People murdered in Quebec
Professional wrestlers from Montreal
Sportspeople from Laval, Quebec
Canadian sportspeople of Italian descent
Unsolved murders in Canada
Assassinations in Canada
People murdered by Canadian organized crime
Canadian gangsters of Italian descent
Murdered Canadian gangsters
Cotroni crime family
1993 in Quebec
NWA Canadian Heavyweight Champions
NWA Americas Tag Team Champions
WCW World Tag Team Champions